Shanthi Nagar or Shanthi Nagar Colony is the name of a Colony.

This is one of the major and oldest colonies of Nalgonda, Telangana, India.
It is a part of Nalgonda city and now comes under One-Town having Pincode of 508001.

It is one of the most frequently used names for residential colonies in India.

Shanthi means Peace.
Nagar is a Sanskrit word for city.

Cities and towns in Nalgonda district